The 2000 Women's National Invitation Tournament was a single-elimination tournament of 32 NCAA Division I teams that were not selected to participate in the 2000 Women's NCAA tournament. It was the third edition of the postseason Women's National Invitation Tournament (WNIT).

The final four of the tournament paired Arkansas against Florida with the other match-up being Wisconsin and Colorado State. Wisconsin beat Colorado State 78–60 and Florida beat Arkansas 83–62.

Bracket
Games marked signify overtime.

Nortth bracket

West bracket

Midwest bracket

East bracket

Semifinals and championship game

All-tournament team
Tamara Moore, Wisconsin (MVP)
LaTonya Sims, Wisconsin
Naomi Mobley, Florida
Tonya Washington, Florida
Angie Gordon, Colorado State
Lonniya Bragg, Arkansas

Source:

See also
2000 NCAA Division I women's basketball tournament

References

Women's National Invitation Tournament
Women's National Invitation Tournament
1999–2000 NCAA Division I women's basketball season
2000 in sports in Wisconsin